James Lamar "Rags" Faircloth (August 19, 1892 – October 5, 1953) was a Major League Baseball pitcher. In 2 career games, he had a 0-0 record with a 9.00 ERA. He batted and threw right-handed.

Faircloth was born in Kenton, Tennessee and died in Tucson, Arizona.

External links

1892 births
1953 deaths
Philadelphia Phillies players
Baseball players from Tennessee
People from Kenton, Tennessee
Mississippi State Bulldogs baseball players